The blunt-jawed elephantnose or wormjawed mormyrid (Campylomormyrus tamandua) is a species of elephantfish. It is found in rivers in West and Middle Africa. It is brown or black with a long elephant-like snout with the mouth located near the tip. Its diet consists of worms, fish, and insects.

See also
List of freshwater aquarium fish species

References

Mormyridae
Weakly electric fish
Fish described in 1862
Taxa named by Albert Günther